West Cross is an area in Swansea, Wales.

West Cross also may refer to:

 West Cross (electoral ward), which includes the West Cross area
 West Cross Street in Morristown Historic District, Morristown, Ohio

See also 
 West Cross Route, stretch of elevated highway in Central London
 "W. Cross Pkwy", signage term for Wilbur Cross Parkway in Connecticut, U.S.A.